Brian Hooks is an American non-profit leader who currently serves as CEO and Chairman of Stand Together. He also serves as President of the Charles Koch Foundation, President of the Charles Koch Institute, and was previously Executive Director and Chief Operating Officer of the Mercatus Center at George Mason University.

Early life and education
He attended the University of Michigan from 1996 to 2000, graduating with a B.A. in Political Science.

Career
Hooks served as Director of the Global Prosperity Initiative and Social Change Project from September 2000 to June 2005. He also helped develop and manage the Enterprise Africa project, which studied the role of entrepreneurship in economic development.

He then became Director of the Mercatus Center at George Mason University from July 2005 to June 2014. He became President of the Charles Koch Foundation in Arlington, Virginia, in July 2014; a month later he also became associated with the Charles Koch Institute. In July 2018, Hooks was named Chairman and CEO of Stand Together, and was co-chair of the Koch Network from 2016-2018. During the Covid-19 pandemic of 2020, Hooks announced that Stand Together would create an online effort to provide cash assistance through donations to families hit the hardest and the promotion of cooperation in communities.

Personal life
Hooks lives in Virginia, with his wife and daughter.

References

Living people
American philanthropists
George Mason University people
Mercatus Center
Year of birth missing (living people)
Koch network
 University of Michigan alumni